"No Surprises" is a song by the English alternative rock band Radiohead, released as the fourth and final single from their third studio album, OK Computer (1997), on 12 January 1998. It reached number four on the UK Singles Chart. It features glockenspiel and a "childlike" sound inspired by the 1966 Beach Boys album Pet Sounds.

The music video, directed by Grant Gee, features the singer, Thom Yorke, inside a diving helmet as it fills with water. Gee was inspired by the 1968 science fiction film 2001: A Space Odyssey, underwater escape acts and the television series UFO. He fixated on the lyric "a job that slowly kills you", and conceived a real-time video that would convey the feeling of "murderous seconds".

Recording
Thom Yorke wrote "No Surprises" while Radiohead was touring with R.E.M. in 1995. Yorke introduced the song to the rest of the band in their dressing room in Oslo, Norway on August 3, 1995. Later, the lyrics were rewritten and a glockenspiel melody was added. It was the first song recorded in the sessions for OK Computer. Yorke said the "childlike guitar sound set the mood for the whole album" and that the band was aiming for a mood similar to the 1966 Beach Boys album Pet Sounds. He also said Radiohead wanted to recreate the atmosphere of a song by Marvin Gaye or the Louis Armstrong song "What a Wonderful World". "No Surprises" is in the key of F major.

The version on the album is the first take recorded; the band recorded many further versions, but felt they could not improve on the first. Hoping to achieve a slower tempo than could be played well on their instruments, the producer, Nigel Godrich, had the band record the song at a faster tempo, then slowed the playback for Yorke to overdub his vocals onto, creating an "ethereal" effect.

The bassist, Colin Greenwood, said that "No Surprises" was Radiohead's "'stadium-friendly'" song. He said the concept was to frighten OK Computer listeners with "Climbing Up the Walls", then comfort them "with a pop song with a chorus that sounds like a lullaby". Yorke told Q: "If you play it right, it is fucking dark. But it's like acting. It's on the edge of totally hamming it up but you're not. It's just the words are so dark. When we play it, we have to play it so slow. It only sounds good if it's really fragile."

Release
"No Surprises" was released as the fourth single from OK Computer on 12 January 1998. It reached number four on the UK Singles Chart. In 2008, it was included in Radiohead: The Best Of. An early version with different lyrics was included in the 2017 OK Computer reissue OKNOTOK 1997 2017. In October 2011, NME named "No Surprises" the 107th best track of the previous 15 years.

Music video
The music video for "No Surprises" consists of a single close-up shot of Yorke inside an astronaut-style helmet. The lyrics slowly scroll upwards, reflected in the helmet. After the first verse, the helmet begins to fill with water. Yorke continues singing as he attempts to lift his head above the rising water. Once the helmet completely fills, Yorke is motionless for over a minute, after which the water is released and he resumes singing.The music video was directed by Grant Gee and was shot on November 28, 1997. Initially, Radiohead and their record label, Parlophone, planned to film music videos for each track on OK Computer. Gee pitched concepts for "No Surprises" and "Fitter Happier". His initial concept for "No Surprises", which Gee later described as "some kind of sparkly music-box themed performance-based nonsense", was rejected. His "Fitter Happier" concept was abandoned when Parlophone decided to shoot videos only for the singles.

Six months later, after Gee had been filming Radiohead for the documentary Meeting People Is Easy, Parlophone wanted a music video for "No Surprises" and asked Gee to pitch another concept. Gee listened to the song while studying a still image of the astronaut character David Bowman in the 1968 science fiction film 2001: A Space Odyssey, and wondered if he could make a music video comprising a close-up of a man in a helmet. He was also inspired by childhood memories of underwater escape acts and alien characters in the television series UFO with helmets full of liquid. He fixated on the lyric "a job that slowly kills you", and conceived a real-time video that would convey the feeling of "murderous seconds".

The crew hired a special effects company to create a perspex helmet, into which water could be slowly pumped and would allow Yorke to release the water in an emergency. To reduce the time for which Yorke had to hold his breath, the crew sped up part of the song, doubled the camera speed from 25 to 50 frames per second to match, and then decelerated both the song and frame rate after the water drained, keeping Yorke's vocals in synchronisation. Although Yorke had demonstrated that he could hold his breath for over a minute in stress-free conditions, under the shooting conditions he found it difficult to hold his breath for more than ten seconds before draining the water. According to Gee, "The day turned into a horror show ... [It was] repeated torture." Footage of the shoot appears in Meeting People is Easy, with Yorke becoming increasingly frustrated. After many failed takes, with coaching from the assistant director, Yorke was eventually able to complete a take.

No Surprises/Running from Demons 

No Surprises/Running from Demons is the fourth extended play (EP) by Radiohead, released in December 1997. The EP was aimed at the Japanese market to promote the band's Japan tour of January 1998.

"Meeting in the Aisle" is Radiohead's first completely instrumental track. This "remixed" version of "Pearly*" (as opposed to the "original version" available on the "Paranoid Android" single and Airbag / How Am I Driving? EP) features clearer production values, louder guitar at the beginning of the song, and a different guitar line at the end.

The song "Bishop's Robes" refers to Yorke's experience of cruelty at school. Though he claims that he suffered no physical punishment as a schoolboy, violence was felt in ghastly mind games, and in the teacher's cruelty: hence the line "bastard headmaster". The song covers similar thematic material as The Smiths' "The Headmaster Ritual", which Radiohead covered in one of their 2007 webcasts. "Bishop's Robes" is also included on the "Street Spirit (Fade Out)" 'CD1' single.

"A Reminder" contains excerpts from the reports of the Prague metro in the Czech Republic.

Track listing
All songs written by Radiohead (Thom Yorke, Jonny Greenwood, Ed O'Brien, Colin Greenwood and Philip Selway).

CD 1
"No Surprises" – 3:51
"Palo Alto" – 3:44
"How I Made My Millions" – 3:07

CD 2
"No Surprises" – 3:50
"Airbag" (Live in Berlin) – 4:49
"Lucky" (Live in Florence) – 4:34

No Surprises/Running from Demons
"No Surprises" – 3:49
"Pearly*" – 3:38
"Melatonin" – 2:08
"Meeting in the Aisle" – 3:07
"Bishop's Robes" – 3:23
"A Reminder" – 3:51

Personnel
Thom Yorke – vocals, acoustic guitar
Jonny Greenwood – glockenspiel, organ, string synth, electric guitar
Ed O'Brien – electric guitar, tambourine, backing vocals
Colin Greenwood – bass guitar
Philip Selway – drums, tambourine

Charts

Weekly charts

Year-end charts

Certifications

Alternative versions and covers
Versions have also been recorded by K's Choice, Luka Bloom, Malia, Blake Morgan, Yaron Herman Trio, Christopher O'Riley, Paige, Peter Jöback, Motorama, Louis Durra, Stanisław Sojka, Scott Matthew, Northern State, and Postmodern Jukebox. American singer songwriter Amanda Palmer recorded a version of this song for her album of Radiohead covers performed on ukulele, Amanda Palmer Performs the Popular Hits of Radiohead on Her Magical Ukulele. It was also covered by Blake Morgan on his 2006 album Silencer. A piano interpretation of the song was used in the second episode of the HBO show Westworld in 2016. Roman GianArthur, of Janelle Monáe's Wondaland Arts Society, released OK Lady, an EP of Radiohead R&B mash-up covers including "No Surprises" (featuring Monáe) in the fall of 2015.

Regina Spektor version 

Regina Spektor, alternative pianist and anti-folk musician, released a one-track charity single of the song on April 27, 2010. All proceeds go to the Doctors Without Borders Emergency Relief Fund.

Charts

References

Further reading

External links
 

1996 songs
1998 singles
2010 singles
Capitol Records singles
EMI Records EPs
Parlophone EPs
Parlophone singles
Radiohead songs
Regina Spektor songs
Sire Records singles
Songs about depression
Songs about suicide
Song recordings produced by Nigel Godrich
Songs written by Colin Greenwood
Songs written by Ed O'Brien
Songs written by Jonny Greenwood
Songs written by Philip Selway
Songs written by Thom Yorke